Ashbourne is a market town in the Derbyshire Dales district in Derbyshire, England. Its population was measured at 8,377 in the 2011 census  and was estimated to have grown to 9,163 by 2019. It has many historical buildings and independent shops. The town offers a historic annual Shrovetide football match. Its position near the southern edge of the Peak District makes it the closest town to Dovedale, to which Ashbourne is sometimes referred to as the gateway. 

Nearby towns include Matlock, Uttoxeter, Leek, Cheadle and Bakewell.

History
The town's name derives from the Old English æsc-burna meaning "stream with ash trees".

Ashbourne was granted a market charter in 1257. In medieval times it was a frequent rest stop for pilgrims walking "St Non's Way" to the shrine of Saint Fremund at Dunstable in Bedfordshire.

The forces of Charles Edward Stuart passed through Ashbourne during the Jacobite rising of 1745.

Governance
Ashbourne Town Council has four wards – Belle Vue, Hilltop, Parkside and St Oswald's – represented by a total of 13 councillors. It meets at Ashbourne Town Hall in the Market Place.

Geography
Ashbourne Green and Sturston are hamlets close by. Henmore Brook, a tributary of the River Dove, flows through the middle of the town.

Economy
From 1910, Nestlé had a creamery in the town which, for a period, was contracted to produce Carnation condensed milk. The factory had its own private sidings connected to the railway station goods yard, which allowed milk trains to access the facility and distribute product as far south as London. After milk trains ceased in 1965, the railway track was lifted as passenger services and the railway station had already been closed back in 1954. The factory closed in 2003 and, since demolition in 2006, has been redeveloped as housing and a light industrial estate, although the old loading ramp from street level up to the factory floor is still in place.

Water from a borehole on the site was first marketed as Ashbourne Water in 1975 and was sold mostly to the catering trade. Nestlé retained the borehole after the factory shut, taking water by tanker to Buxton for bottling. Declining sales (1.3 million bottles in 2005, compared to 90 million for Buxton water) meant it could not justify further investment and the brand was discontinued in 2006.

Tourism is an important element of the local economy, due to the town's proximity to Dovedale and the Peak District. The Tourist Information Centre was closed in 2011 but, from January 2018, a visitor information centre was made available again in the town hall.

Culture and community

The cobbled market place hosts a traditional outdoor market every Thursday and Saturday throughout the year, complementing the wide range of individual shops in the town. Although its market heritage is important, it came under threat of closure from Derbyshire County Council in November 2012. The people of Ashbourne opposed any such moves by the council and started an online petition. Ashbourne became the 97th Fairtrade Town in March 2005 after many businesses, cafes, shops and community organisations started supporting Fairtrade.

Ashbourne Shire Horse Society and Show
According to the Ashbourne Show website:

Landmarks

Ashbourne currently has eleven public houses and two social clubs. The most famous, the Green Man & Black's Head Royal Hotel, closed in 2011 and underwent a change of ownership in 2013, before reopening in 2018. The rare gallows sign across St John's Street remains a meeting point in the town. In June 2020, the caricature of a black man's head atop the sign became the focus of racial debate. It was removed after a petition had gathered more than 40,000 signatures, but it is being preserved locally.

Transport

Railway
Ashbourne railway station once served the town on the Ashbourne to Buxton railway line; the line was closed to regular passenger traffic in 1954. 

Today, the nearest railway stations are Uttoxeter, 12 miles away on the Crewe-Derby Line, and Derby, 13 miles away on the Midland Main Line.

History
Construction of the Ashbourne to Buxton line began in 1896. Passenger services started to Buxton in August 1899, after the building of a joint railway station to serve the London and North Western Railway (LNWR) and North Staffordshire Railway (NSR) lines. It closed to regular passenger traffic in 1954; all services on the Ashbourne–Parsley Hay section ceased in 1963. The line continued down the Dove to Rocester, near Uttoxeter, where it joined the main North Staffordshire Railway. This southern link had opened in 1852 and, in 1867, the LNWR gained running powers over the line. It also closed to passengers in 1954 and completely in the early 1960s.

The course of the Ashbourne to Buxton line up to Parsley Hay has since been converted to the Tissington Trail, a popular recreational walking and cycle path.

Buses
Bus services in the area are provided by High Peak Buses and TrentBarton. There is a half-hourly service between Derby and Uttoxeter that stops in Ashbourne; other routes connect the town with Matlock, Leek, Buxton, Nottingham, Wirksworth and Burton.

Recreation
The Tissington Trail commences in the town. The path starts at Mappleton Lane on the northern outskirts of the town, accessed by a Victorian tunnel about 380 yards long from the site of the former railway station. It follows the course of the former railway through the village of Tissington and joins the High Peak Trail (the old Cromford and High Peak Railway) at Parsley Hay.

The Limestone Way passes 2–3 miles away, through Tissington, Thorpe, Marten Hill and above Mayfield to Rocester. There are several routes for walkers from Ashbourne to Limestone Way.

Education
The main secondary school is Queen Elizabeth's Grammar School, founded in 1585. It moved to its current site on the Green Road in 1909 and took over Ashbourne County Secondary School in 1973.

Religious sites
The  spire of St Oswald's Church overlooks the town. The church is Early English in style and was built around 1220. There are a few remnants of earlier Norman construction and the south aisle has part of a Saxon cross shaft.

The church of St John was built on Buxton Road in 1871 in a neo-Norman style. Ashbourne Churches Together (ACT) has a link with the Diocese of Patna in the ecumenical Church of North India. Regular reciprocal visits take place. Members of ACT are currently sponsoring the education of children in a school in Bihar, one of the poorest states in India.

Sport
In the annual two-day Royal Shrovetide Football Match, one half of the town plays the other, using the town as the pitch, with goals three miles apart. As many as several thousand players compete for two days with a hand-painted, cork-filled ball. The game is played by two teams, the Up'ards and the Down'ards, over two eight-hour periods, subject to a few rules. Shrovetide football has been played for several centuries. It is a moving mass (the Hug) that continues through the roads of the town, across fields, and even along the bed of the local Henmore Brook. There were intermittent unsuccessful attempts to ban the game until the late 19th century.

Before the 1966 Football World Cup, the West German squad stayed at the nearby Peveril of the Peak Hotel and trained on one of Ashbourne's town football pitches near the park.

Local contestant Dave Mellor was the 1978 BriSCA Formula 1 Stock Cars World Champion.

Notable people
In birth order:
Sir Aston Cockayne (1608–1684), 1st Baronet Cockayne of Ashbourne
Catherine Pegge (born c. 1635) was mistress to Charles II, mother to Charles FitzCharles, 1st Earl of Plymouth, and a resident of Yeldersley.
Henry Cantrell (1684–1773), clergyman and religious controversialist, was born here.
Hill Boothby (1708–1756), late love of Samuel Johnson, was born here.
Thomas Brown (1708–1780), Garter King of Arms, was born here.
George Hayne (died 1723), merchant and entrepreneur
Sir Brooke Boothby, 6th Baronet (1744–1824), poet, was born here.
William Corden the Elder (1795–1867), portrait painter
Catherine Booth (1829–1890), known as the "mother" of the Salvation Army', was born here.
Francis Charles Robert Jourdain (1865–1940), ornithologist, was born in Ashbourne in 1865 and for a time served as Vicar of Clifton-by-Ashbourne.
David Redfern (1935–2014), photographer
Roy Wood (born 1946), musician, lives here.
Andrew Lewer (born 1971), East Midlands MEP, lived in Ashbourne and attended Queen Elizabeth's Grammar School, Ashbourne.
James Rutledge (born 1978), musician and producer
Dave Tyack (1978 – c. 2002), guitarist, drummer and singer

See also
Listed buildings in Ashbourne, Derbyshire
Royal Shrovetide Football
St Oswald's Hospital

References

External links

Ashbourne Town official website

 
Towns in Derbyshire
Market towns in Derbyshire
Towns and villages of the Peak District
Civil parishes in Derbyshire
Derbyshire Dales